Bures is a locality in Key West Rural Municipality No. 70 in the province of Saskatchewan, Canada. Located 3 east of highway 623 on Range Road 221, approximately 15 km north of the town of Ogema.

History

Bures is located at SW-36-8-22 W2M was founded predominantly by Scandinavian settlers in 1933. The community was named by Mr. C.P. Ennals who originally came from Bures, Suffolk, England.

A grain elevator was built in 1925 next to the railway, by 1933 the community had a post office, general store operated by Mr. L.B. Quinn. In 1940 Bures Co-op was incorporated, later moving to Ogema in 1954.

Bures School was located 1.5 km south of the community at 26-8-22 W2M opening in 1911, E.A. Kilpatrick was the first teacher. The school was closed in 1957 and the store and post office in 1967.

Notable residents
 Earl McCready, Canadian freestyle sport wrestler who competed in the 1928 Summer Olympics, residing in Bures for a short time.

See also
 List of communities in Saskatchewan

References

Unincorporated communities in Saskatchewan
Key West No. 70, Saskatchewan
Ghost towns in Saskatchewan
Division No. 2, Saskatchewan